Jorge Edwards Valdés (29 June 1931 – 17 March 2023) was a Chilean novelist, journalist and diplomat. He was the Chilean ambassador to France during the first Piñera presidency.

Life and career
Edwards attended law school at the Universidad de Chile.

During the presidency of Salvador Allende, Edwards reopened the Chilean embassy in Havana, Cuba, but only three months later, the government of Fidel Castro declared him persona non grata. From this episode he wrote what is perhaps his most famous work, Persona non grata (1971).

In June 1994, Edwards accepted the post of Ambassador for Chile before the United Nations Educational, Scientific and Cultural Organization (UNESCO), which has its headquarters in Paris, a city where Edwards resided for many years. Edwards lived in Santiago de Chile.

In 2008, his novel La Casa de Dostoievsky won the prestigious Premio Iberoamericano Planeta-Casa de América de Narrativa, one of the richest literary prizes in the world, worth $200,000.

In 2010, Edwards was granted Spanish citizenship by King Juan Carlos I of Spain.

Awards and honors
1979 He entered the Academia Chilena de la Lengua
1994 Chilean National Prize for Literature
1999 Cervantes Prize
2000 Gabriela Mistral Order of Educational and Cultural Merit
2008 Premio Iberoamericano Planeta-Casa de América de Narrativa
2016 Grand Cross of the Civil Order of Alfonso X, the Wise

Bibliography
Jorge Edwards was the youngest of the Edwards Valdés siblings (Carmen, Laura, Angélica, Luis Germán and himself); on their mother's side (Valdés) they descend directly from José Miguel Carrera.

Short stories
El patio (1962)
Gente de la ciudad (1961)
Las máscaras (1967)
Temas y variaciones (1969)
Fantasmas de carne y hueso (1993)

Novels
El peso de la noche (1965)
Persona non grata (1973)
Los convidados de piedra (1978)
El museo de cera (1981)
La mujer imaginaria (1985)
El anfitrión (1987)
El origen del mundo (1996)
El sueño de la historia (2000)
El inútil de la familia (2004), about Joaquín Edwards Bello.
La Casa de Dostoievsky (2008)

Journalism
Jorge Edwards wrote for several newspapers in Chile and Latin America (La Nación, Buenos Aires) and Europe (Le Monde, Paris; and El País, Madrid). A large portion of his journalistic work has been collected in two books:
El whisky de los poetas (1997)
Diálogos en un tejado (2003)

Other works
He has also written essays and biographies:
Desde la cola del dragón (1973)
Adiós, poeta (about Pablo Neruda, 1990)
Machado de Assís (about the Brazilian writer Joaquim Maria Machado de Assis, 2002)

Teaching
Jorge Edwards taught a course at the University of Chicago during the autumn quarter of 2008. The course was titled My personal history of the boom.

See also
Edwards family

References

External links
Jorge Edwards in the Biblioteca Virtual Cervantes
Biography of Jorge Edwards in Escritores.cl
Biography of Jorge Edwards
Awards and work
Interview about El inútil de la familia

1931 births
2023 deaths
Jorge
People from Santiago
20th-century Chilean novelists
20th-century Chilean male writers
Chilean columnists
Chilean male novelists
Chilean diplomats
Members of the Chilean Academy of Language
Chilean people of Welsh descent
Premio Cervantes winners
University of Chile alumni
Princeton University alumni
National Prize for Literature (Chile) winners
Ambassadors of Chile to France
Recipients of the Civil Order of Alfonso X, the Wise
Chevaliers of the Ordre des Arts et des Lettres
Evópoli politicians
21st-century Chilean novelists
21st-century Chilean male writers
20th-century Chilean short story writers
Chilean essayists
Chilean biographers
21st-century Chilean short story writers
Chilean male short story writers